Bennetts Switch is an unincorporated community in Deer Creek Township, Miami County, in the U.S. state of Indiana.

History
Bennetts Switch (historically spelled with the apostrophe, Bennett's Switch) was laid out shortly after the Lake Erie and Western Railroad was built through the settlement. The community was named for landowner Baldwin M. Bennett, a native of New York. A post office was established at Bennetts Switch in 1862, and remained in operation until it was discontinued in 1935.

References

Unincorporated communities in Miami County, Indiana
Unincorporated communities in Indiana
1862 establishments in Indiana